Humeburn is a locality in the Shire of Paroo, Queensland, Australia.

Geography 
The Paroo River flows through the locality from the north (Cooladdi) to the south (Eulo).

The Boobara Opal Reserve is located in the south-east of the locality.
  

The county is divided into civil  parishes.

History 
The locality most likely takes its name from the Humeburn pastoral lease of  operated by A.F. Sullivan in the District of Warrego in 1865. Sullivan also operated two similarly sized pastoral leases in the area called Humeburn North and Humeburn South. As at 2016, the Humeburn pastoral station still operates as a beef cattle producer.

References 

Shire of Paroo
Localities in Queensland